Alan Frederick Plater  (15 April 1935 – 25 June 2010) was an English playwright and screenwriter, who worked extensively in British television from the 1960s to the 2000s.

Career
Plater was born in Jarrow, County Durham, although his family moved to Hull in 1938. 
He attended Kingston High School.

Jarrow was much publicised as a severely economically depressed area before the Second World War (Plater joked that his family left Jarrow just after the Great Depression to catch Hull just before the Blitz).  He trained as an architect at King's College, Newcastle (later the Newcastle University School of Architecture, Planning and Landscape), but only practised in the profession briefly, at a junior level. He later stated that it was shortly after he was forced to fend off a herd of pigs from eating his tape measure while he was surveying a field that he left to pursue writing full-time. Plater stayed in the north of England for many years after he became prominent as a writer and lived in Hull.

He first made his mark as a scriptwriter for Z-Cars (1962–65), along with its spin-offs Softly, Softly (1966–69) and Softly, Softly: Task Force (1969–76). His subsequent credits include The Reluctant Juggler in the series The Edwardians (1972), Shoulder to Shoulder (1974), The Stars Look Down (1975), Trinity Tales (1975), Oh No It's Selwyn Froggitt, The Journal of Vasilije Bogdanovic, the musical Close the Coalhouse Door with songwriter Alex Glasgow from the writings of Sid Chaplin, Get Lost! (1981), On Your Way, Riley (1982), Fortunes of War (1987) an adaptation based on the novels of Olivia Manning, The Beiderbecke Trilogy (1985–1988), Misterioso (an adaptation of his novel, 1991), Oliver's Travels (1995), an adaptation of J.B. Priestley's The Good Companions (1980) for Yorkshire Television, a film adaptation of George Orwell's Keep the Aspidistra Flying, Belonging and the theatre play Peggy for You, based on the life of Plater's former agent Peggy Ramsay, which was nominated in 2001 for a Laurence Olivier Theatre Award.

He also contributed to the BBC series Dalziel and Pascoe, and adapted Chris Mullin's novel A Very British Coup (1988) for television. He was the driving force behind the TV version of Flambards, which under his influence was claimed to be slanted well to the political left of K. M. Peyton's original books. Jazz is a recurring motif through much of Plater's work, often referenced explicitly as well as underpinning his story structures. Among his few feature films he collaborated twice with Christopher Miles on two successful D.H.Lawrence projects The Virgin and the Gypsy and Priest of Love.

He was a supporter of Hull City A.F.C. His play Confessions of a City Supporter on his lifelong relationship with the club was staged during the first-ever run of performances at the new home of the Hull Truck Theatre Company.

Plater on his own work

In an interview with Richard Whiteley, Plater claimed he had never intended to write sensational plot-driven sagas with outlandish characters and that he had never intended to make the sort of "rubbish programmes featuring high-speed car crashes of which there are too many on television". Plater said that he had always tried to make his characters normal people, whose normal lives are interrupted when the outside world comes into their lives.

Plater claimed his two best-known characters, Trevor Chaplin and Jill Swinburne in the Beiderbecke series, were based on himself. Trevor represented his personal interests, jazz, football and snooker (the parallel of someone from the northeast in Yorkshire also fitted) while Jill represented his political beliefs such as conservationism, environmentalism and socialism. The couple were based on his earlier characters of Neville Keaton and Judy Threadgold in Get Lost! (1981).

Personal life and honours
Plater was married to Shirley Johnson (1958–85), with whom he had two sons and a daughter, and later Shirley Rubinstein (from 1986) gaining three stepsons.

Plater was president of the Writers' Guild of Great Britain from September 1991 until April 1995. He received honorary degrees from the University of Hull and Northumbria University in Newcastle. In the New Year's Honours List published 31 December 2004, he was created a Commander of the Order of the British Empire for services to drama. He is commemorated with a green plaque on The Avenues, Kingston upon Hull.

Death
Plater died of cancer at a London hospice at the age of 75. His death was announced on 25 June 2010.

References

Further reading
 (play)
 (novel)
 (play)
 (play)
 (play)
 (novel)
 (memoir)

External links

"Alan Plater profile" at "British Film Institute's Screenonline website"
The Golden Age of Yorkshire TV – Alan Plater speech (available as podcast)
2004 interview with The Independent
Interview with Theatre Archive Project
Diversity Website: Alan Plater's Radio Plays

1935 births
2010 deaths
Writers from Kingston upon Hull
People from Jarrow
Writers from Tyne and Wear
Alumni of Newcastle University
English screenwriters
English male screenwriters
English television writers
Fellows of the Royal Society of Literature
Commanders of the Order of the British Empire
Deaths from cancer in England
English male dramatists and playwrights
20th-century English dramatists and playwrights
20th-century English male writers
British male television writers